Jan Bang (born 21 August 1968) is a Norwegian musician and record producer who has worked with Morten Harket, Sidsel Endresen, David Sylvian, Nils Petter Molvær, Arild Andersen, Bugge Wesseltoft, Arve Henriksen, and Erik Honoré.

Career

Bang played with Erik Honoré in "Woodlands" (EP, 1988), and they have released two albums (2000, 2001).  He has also contributed to albums with Bertine Zetlitz, Bel Canto, and has written music for the film Ballen i øyet (2000).  In recent years he has played with Dhafer Youssef, and in 2004 he received the Gammleng Award i klassen studio, and together with musician colleague, Erik Honoré, he initiated "Punktfestivalen" in 2005.

He is one of Norway's most accomplished and influential producers and the epithet electronics guru has stayed with him for a long time and with good reason. Bang is the kind of musical innovator and bridge-builder who consistently manages to balance progressive thinking with popular appeal. He is always looking for ways of moving music and people forward, and by creating new meeting places and musical intersections he is the kind of person who makes events like "Scene Norway" possible. In addition to hosting "Punkt", Bang will also contribute to the opening concert where he will perform with one of his many musical collaborators, the celebrated Norwegian trumpet player Arve Henriksen.

John Kelman of the All About Jazz magazine, recognized Jason Moran & Jan Bang at the Moldejazz and Arve Henriksen/Jan Bang Double CD Release Show at the Punkt Festival, Kristiansand, Norway, September 2013, as one of his 25 "Best Live Shows of 2013".

Bang has also appeared live at Music Tech Fest Berlin in 2016  with Mercury nominee Eska in a unique one-off improvised performance.

Honors
Gammleng Award 2004, in the class Studio

Discography
Solo
1989: Frozen Feelings (CBS) - featuring Morten Harket and Sidsel Endresen; the title song was the credit soundtrack of the Icelandic movie Foxtrot (1988; director: Jón Tryggvason)
1998: Pop Killer (Virgin), nominated for Spellemannprisen 1999 in the class Dance. Featuring contributions from Nils Petter Molvær, Arild Andersen, DJ Strangefruit and Bugge Wesseltoft
2010: ...And Poppies from Kandahar (Samadhisound)
2013: Narrative from the Subtropics (Jazzland)
2013: Victoria (Jazzland), with Erik Honoré, Gaute Storaas, Arve Henriksen

With Erik Honoré
2000: Birth Wish (Pan m), with contributions from Arve Henriksen and Christian Wallumrød
2001: Going Nine Ways from Wednesday (Pan m), with Nils Christian Moe-Repstad]and Anne Marie Almedal
2006: Crime Scenes (Punkt, 2006; Jazzland, 2007)
2008: Live Remixes Vol. 1 (Jazzland) - Featuring Sidsel Endresen and Jon Hassell

With Eivind Aarset
2004: Connected (Jazzland)
2007: Sonic Codex (Jazzland)
2012: Dream Logic (ECM)

With Eivind Aarset and Seán Mac Erlaine
2018: Music for Empty Ears (Ergodos)

With David Sylvian, Erik Honoré, Arve Henriksen and Sidsel Endresen
2012: Uncommon Deities (Samadhisound)

With Erik Honoré, Gaute Storaas and Arve Henriksen
2013: Knut Hamsun's "Victoria" - Soundtrack (Jazzland)

With Tigran Hamasyan, Arve Henriksen, and Eivind Aarset
2016: Atmosphères (ECM)

With Dark Star Safari (Erik Honoré, Samuel Rohrer, and Eivind Aarset)
2019: Dark Star Safari (2019 album) (Arjunamusic Records)

As contributor
2002: Camphor David Sylvian (Virgin) - remix of "Mother and Child" featuring Erik Honoré and Nils Petter Molvær
2003: Digital Prophecy Dhafer Youssef (Justin Time)
2004: Grace Ketil Bjørnstad (Universal)
2004: Chiaroscuro Arve Henriksen (Rune Grammofon)
2005: er Nils Petter Molvær (Sula)
2005: Good Son Vs the Only Daughter David Sylvian (Samadhisound) - remix of "The Only Daughter" featuring Erik Honoré and Nils Petter Molvær
2006: Divine Shadows Dhafer Youssef (Jazzland)
2006: Northern Lights Mike Mainieri (NYC)
2006: An American Compilation Nils Petter Molvær (Thirsty Ear)
2008: Cartography Arve Henriksen (ECM)
2008: Last Night the Moon Came Dropping Its Clothes in the Street Jon Hassell (ECM)
2008: Re-vision Nils Petter Molvær (Sula)
2009: Ellivan Arve Henriksen and Elling Vanberg
2009: Hamada Nils Petter Molvær (Sula)
2010: Sleepwalkers David Sylvian (Samadhisound)
2011: Died in the Wool – Manafon Variations David Sylvian (Samadhisound)
2012: Release Audun Kleive (POLSelection)
2013: Places of Worship'' Arve Henriksen (Rune Grammofon)

References

External links

Norwegian composers
Norwegian male composers
ECM Records artists
1968 births
Living people
Musicians from Kristiansand
Generator X (band) members
Jazzland Recordings (1997) artists